Silvaninus is a genus of beetles in the family Silvanidae, containing the following species:

 Silvaninus consors Sharp
 Silvaninus nitidus Grouvelle

References

Silvanidae genera